James Warburton (born 1970) is an Australian businessman who is currently Managing Director and Chief Executive Officer of Seven West Media.

Business career

Television executive
Warburton had early executive roles at McCann-Erickson, DDB Worldwide and Hyundai Motor Company in the 1980s and 1990s. Warburton became Managing Director of Universal McCann in 2000, winning and retaining multiple significant government and corporate contracts over the following three years.

In 2003, Warburton took on his first role in the television industry, becoming sales director of the Seven Network. In 2011, Warburton was poached by Acting CEO Lachlan Murdoch to become CEO of the Ten Network. Seven launched a legal challenge to the defection and the Supreme Court of New South Wales ruled that Warburton could not start at Ten until 1 January 2012, five months later than scheduled. After less than 14 months in the role, Warburton was sacked and replaced by Hamish McLennan.

Motorsports

In May 2013, Warburton was announced as CEO of V8 Supercars and remained in the role until 2017, in which time Warburton was credited with stabilising the business and signing long-term television and title sponsorship deals for the sport. Warburton later continued his association with motorsport, taking on a non-executive director role in 2019 with the Australian Racing Group, promoters of series including TCR Australia Touring Car Series and the Australian S5000 Championship.

After leaving the renamed Supercars Championship in 2017, Warburton joined APN Outdoor as CEO, departing after the organisation was taken over by JCDecaux ten months later. In 2019, Warburton launched a consultancy business which took a stake in the Shopper Media Group.

Return to Seven West Media

Warburton returned to Seven in 2019 as Managing Director and CEO of Seven West Media, replacing Tim Worner. Soon after, Warburton launched a significant restructure of the business.

Personal life
Warburton is married to Nikki Warburton, the chief customer & marketing officer of Audi Australia.

References

Living people
1970 births
Australian television executives
Australian chief executives
Australian motorsport people
Supercars Championship
20th-century Australian businesspeople
21st-century Australian businesspeople